The Laotian legal system is not determined by a democratic parliament or by legal precedent, but by the arbitrary rule of Laos's single party. The main source of law is legislation. There are two types of legislation: legislation of general application and legislation of specific application.

History
Laos inherited its civil legal system from the French colonial administrators. The original civil codes also included Lao customary law.

Issues

Civil liberties and human rights 

The Laos criminal justice system is controlled by the party and the government. There are few legal restraints on government actions, including arrests, which are often arbitrary in nature. Dissent is frequently handled by suppressing basic civil rights. Although the constitution provisions of the mid-1990s cover freedom of worship, expression and press, citizens by December 2010 were not free to exercise these rights fully. There were no legal safeguards and arrests were commonly made on vague charges. 
A penal code and a constitution which guarantee civil liberties have been proposed.  Implementation is another matter, particularly in the area of freedom of political expression. The media is state-controlled.

Nonetheless, there is a system for prosecuting criminal behavior. Common crimes are evaluated at the local village level. More serious cases, especially politically sensitive ones, are referred to higher authorities. Tribunals operate at district and provincial levels with judges appointed by the government.

Both Laotian journalists and Western officials are critical of the limitations on personal freedoms. In 1987, a Laotian journalist living in Thailand noted that there was little popular support for the government, but that most Laotians accepted its authority because they had little choice. In 1988, a Laotian journalist protested that open criticism of the government was forbidden and one of his friends was imprisoned after he complained about the continuing lack of a constitution. The same year, Western diplomats reported that hundreds or thousands of individuals were being held in detention centers in Laos and that citizens were being arrested and held for months without being charged.

In the late 1980s and early 1990s, the government instituted the New Economic Mechanism, a series of sweeping economic reforms geared toward establishing a market-oriented economy. Along with these economic reforms came a slight opening to the West, which provided some opportunity for scrutiny of human rights violations. However, few foreign journalists are allowed to visit Laos, and travel by diplomats and foreign aid workers is restricted. Both domestic and foreign travel by Laotians also is subject to scrutiny and restriction.

Criminal justice system 
The Ministry of Interior is the main instrument of state control and guardianship over the criminal justice system. Ministry of Interior police monitor both Laotians and foreign nationals who live in Laos; there is a system of informants in workplace committees and in residential areas. According to the United States Department of State's Country Reports on Human Rights Practices for 1993, both the party and state monitor various aspects of family and social life through neighborhood and workplace committees. These committees are responsible for maintaining public order and reporting "bad elements" to the police, as well as carrying out political training and disciplining employees.

The criminal justice system is deficient in the area of legal precedent and representation. Trials are not held in public, although trial verdicts are publicly announced. Although there is some provision for appeal, it does not apply to important political cases. Under the constitution, judges and prosecutors are supposed to be independent with their decisions free from outside scrutiny. In practice, however, the courts appear to accept recommendations of other government agencies, especially the Ministry of Interior, in making their decisions. Theoretically, the government provides legal counsel to the accused. In practice, however, defendants represent themselves without outside counsel.

The National Assembly enacted a criminal code and laws establishing a judiciary in November 1989 and a new constitution was adopted by the National Assembly in 1991. 

In 1992 the government launched a campaign to publicize the latter. The leadership claims efforts at developing a legal system with a codified body of laws and a penal code. However, as of mid-1994, there had been little, if any, progress in implementing the freedoms provided for in the constitution and the legal codes still had not been implemented with individuals still being held without being informed of charges or their accusers' identities.

Detention centers

In Laos, there are four categories of persons held in confinement by the State. Aside from common criminals, there are also political, social, and ideological dissidents.  These are people who the government feels are a threat to their control, most commonly because of their public objection to governmental policies or actions.  Commonly the specific crimes for which these dissidents are arrested and confined are vague at best.  Their arrests are typically arbitrary and their length of confinement ambiguous and indefinite.

The LPDR established four different types of detention centers: prisons, reeducation centers or seminar camps, rehabilitation camps, and remolding centers. Social deviants or common criminals were considered less threatening to the regime than persons accused of political crimes, who were considered potential counterrevolutionaries; social deviants were confined in rehabilitation camps. According to MacAlister Brown and Joseph J. Zasloff, prisons were primarily reserved for common criminals, but political prisoners were also held there for usually six to twelve months. Ideologically suspect persons were sent to remolding centers. Reeducation centers were for those deemed politically risky, usually former RLG officials. Political prisoners usually served three- to five-year terms or longer. At the prisons, inmates worked hard under rugged conditions and had limited supplies of food. Bribery in order to secure food and medicine was reported.

In 1986, Brown and Zasloff also reported that prisoners were not tried but were incarcerated by administrative fiat. Former inmates said that they were arrested, informed by the security officials that they had been charged with crimes, and then sent off to camps for indeterminate periods. Typically, prisoners were told one day prior to their release to prepare for departure.

The status of the detention centers is also vague. In 1984, Vientiane declared that all reeducation centers had been closed. At that time, Amnesty International estimated that 6,000 to 7,000 political prisoners were held in these centers. The government acknowledged that there were some former inmates in remote areas but claimed that their confinement was voluntary. In the late 1980s, the government closed some of the reeducation centers and released most of the detainees.

In 1989, Laos took steps to reduce the number of political prisoners, many of whom had been held since 1975. Several hundred detainees, including many high-ranking officials and officers from the former United States-backed RLG and Royal Lao Army, were released from reeducation centers in the northeastern province of Houaphan. Released prisoners reported that hundreds of individuals remained in custody in as many as eight camps, including at least six generals and former high-ranking members of the RLG. These individuals reportedly performed manual labor such as log cutting, repairing roads, and building irrigation systems. In 1993, Amnesty International reported human rights violations in the continued detention of three "prisoners of conscience" detained since 1975 but not sentenced until 1992, as well as those held under restrictions or, according to international standards, the subjects of unfair trials.

As of 1993, reports indicated that some high-ranking officials of the RLG and military remained in state custody. Those accused of hostility toward the government were subject to arrest and confinement for long periods of time. Prison conditions were harsh, and prisoners were routinely denied family visitation and proper medical care.

See also
 Human rights in Laos

References

Law of Laos